Upper Grand Lagoon is a census-designated place (CDP) in Bay County, Florida, United States. The population was 13,963 at the 2010 census. It is part of the Panama City–Lynn Haven–Panama City Beach Metropolitan Statistical Area.

Geography
Upper Grand Lagoon is located at  (30.169898, -85.755909).

Demographics

As of the census of 2000, there were 10,889 people, 4,615 households, and 3,032 families residing in the CDP. The racial makeup of the CDP was 93.66% White, 1.41% African American, 0.82% Native American, 1.63% Asian, 0.09% Pacific Islander, 0.68% from other races, and 1.70% from two or more races. Hispanic or Latino of any race were 2.45% of the population.

There were 4,615 households, out of which 29.3% had children under the age of 18 living with them, 52.2% were married couples living together, 9.7% had a female householder with no husband present, and 34.3% were non-families. 27.5% of all households were made up of individuals, and 7.9% had someone living alone who was 65 years of age or older.  The average household size was 2.33 and the average family size was 2.83.

In the CDP, the population was spread out, with 22.7% under the age of 18, 7.2% from 18 to 24, 31.8% from 25 to 44, 25.4% from 45 to 64, and 12.8% who were 65 years of age or older.  The median age was 39 years. For every 100 females, there were 105.0 males.  For every 100 females age 18 and over, there were 103.6 males.

The median income for a household in the CDP was $42,060, and the median income for a family was $55,000. Males had a median income of $35,179 versus $25,056 for females. The per capita income for the CDP was $24,996.  About 7.5% of families and 9.6% of the population were below the poverty line, including 14.4% of those under age 18 and 7.0% of those age 65 or over.

References

Census-designated places in Bay County, Florida
Census-designated places in Florida
Populated places on the Intracoastal Waterway in Florida